The 1981 Speedway World Pairs Championship was the twelfth FIM Speedway World Pairs Championship. The final took place in Chorzów, Poland. The championship was won by United States first time (23 points). American pair beat New Zealand (22 points) and Poland (21 points).

The win by American's Bruce Penhall and Bobby Schwartz was the first time an American team or riders had won a World Championship in speedway since Jack Milne had won the 1937 World Final at the Wembley Stadium in London, England. Later in 1981 Penhall would go on to win the Individual World Final at Wembley.

Preliminary round
  Prelog
 May 3

Semifinal 1
  Norden
 June 7

Semifinal 2
  Treviso
 June 7

World final
 20 June 1981
  Chorzów, Silesian Stadium

See also
 1981 Individual Speedway World Championship
 1981 Speedway World Team Cup
 motorcycle speedway
 1981 in sports

References

1981
World Pairs